Basma Al-Eshosh (born 20 November 1977) is a Jordanian sprinter. She competed in the women's 100 metres at the 2004 Summer Olympics.

References

1977 births
Living people
Athletes (track and field) at the 2004 Summer Olympics
Jordanian female sprinters
Olympic athletes of Jordan
Place of birth missing (living people)
Olympic female sprinters
21st-century Jordanian women